Batman Total Justice is a line of toys produced by Kenner based on Batman and other, connected, DC Comics characters.

History
In 1996, Kenner started production on a new line of DC Comics character figures. This line, like Legends of Batman and Legends of the Dark Knight, featured all new sculpts of popular DC Comics characters. To appeal to buyers, Kenner produced the line under the high selling Batman title, calling the line Batman: Total Justice. This line featured Batman, Robin and The Huntress, but also included other DC Comics characters including Superman, Green Lantern, The Flash and others.

This was the first line of DC Comics character figures released by Kenner since the Super Powers Collection line of figures ended ten years earlier. Kenner stopped production after only fourteen figures were released. A fourth wave of figures was planned to include Blue Beetle, Dr. Polaris, Fractal Armor Green Lantern and Fractal Armor The Flash. Also, it has been speculated that the fifth assortment - which likely got no further than the earliest of planning stages - was to include Martian Manhunter, Supergirl, a Fractal Armor Robin, and Prometheus as its villain.

Two years later, the Hasbro toy company produced the same figures included in the Total Justice line, but this time released them under the name JLA (a tie-in with the popular comic title). Several of the unproduced Total Justice figures were produced under the JLA name, but no new Batman related characters were included. Each figure in the JLA line included a stand with the JLA logo and a mini comic. Starting with Series 3, the line started to include characters from the Young Justice comic book.

Storyline from the packages
On a distant planet, an evil being known as Darkseid prepares for his invasion and destruction of Earth. Batman learns of this diabolical plan and recruits the world's mightiest super heroes in an all-out assault on Darkseid's forces.

Other media
In 1996, DC Comics produced a three-issue tie-in mini-series featuring the heroes from the first wave (Batman, Robin, Aquaman, Flash and Green Lantern) plus Blue Beetle, Gypsy, Darkseid, and a Parademon ("Mike", who might be the same Parademon from Villains United).

A two-book set of children's books was made based on the series.

Toys

Total Justice

Wave 1
 Aquaman
 Batman
 Darkseid
 The Flash (Wally West)
 Green Lantern (Kyle Rayner)
 Robin (Tim Drake)

Wave 2
 Despero
 Fractal Armor Batman
 Hawkman (Hawk-God version)
 Superman (w/long hair)

Wave 3
 Black Lightning
 Green Arrow (Connor Hawke)
 Huntress (Helena Bertinelli)
 Parallax (Hal Jordan)

Toyfare exclusive
 Reverse-Flash (Eobard Thawne, Professor Zoom)

DC Super-Heroes 2 packs
 Blue Beetle (Ted Kord) & Fractal Armor The Flash w/ the Atom (Ray Palmer)
 Fractal Armor Green Lantern vs Doctor Polaris

JLA

Series 1
 Batman
 Green Lantern
 Green Arrow (in darker comic accurate green)
 Huntress
 The Flash (in darker comic accurate red and gold)
 Superman Blue
 Superman Red

Series 2
 Aquaman
 Dark Knight Batman
 Martian Manhunter
 Steel
 Superman (w/ short hair)
 Zauriel

Series 3
 Caped Crusader Batman
 Impulse
 Plastic Man
 Robin (with comic accurate yellow underside cape)
 Superboy

Series 4
 Atom (Ray Palmer)
 Batman
 Cyber Armor Batman
 Cyber Armor Superman
 Red Tornado
 Wonder Woman

Diamond Exclusive Box Sets
 Box Set #1: Superman Blue, Green Lantern, Huntress, Hologram Batman and Hologram Flash
 Box Set #2: Batman, The Flash, Green Arrow, Hologram Superman and Hologram Green Lantern
 Box Set #3: Martian Manhunter, Superman, Zauriel, Lex Luthor and The Joker
 Box Set #4: Superboy, Robin, Impulse, Hologram Martian Manhunter and Hologram Aquaman

12" Figures
 Aquaman
 The Flash
 Green Lantern
 Martian Manhunter
 Superman Blue

DC Super-Heroes 2001 (WB Store exclusives)
 Aquaman
 Batman
 Despero
 Green Arrow
 Hawkman
 Robin

Total Justice coloring book unmade characters
Some characters appeared in a Total Justice coloring books with fractal techgears, but they were never made as figures under the Total Justice banner are:
 Martian Manhunter
 Oracle
 Steel (John Henry Irons)
 Superboy (Kon-El/Conner Kent)
 Supergirl (Matrix)
 Wonder Woman

All of those characters received figures once the line was rebranded into JLA except Supergirl and Oracle who never received a figure at any point in this line.

Further reading
 Zenker, Gary (2013). Ultimate DC Comics Action Figures and Collectibles Checklist. White Lightning Publishing.

References

External links
 Total Justice comic miniseries

DC Comics limited series
DC Comics superhero teams
Justice League in other media
Total Justice
1990s toys
DC Comics action figure lines